David Pugh may refer to:

David Pugh (1789–1861), Conservative MP for Montgomery Boroughs 1832–1833, 1847–1861
David Pugh (British politician) (1806–1890), Liberal MP for Carmarthenshire, 1857–1868, and East Carmarthenshire, 1885–1890
David Pugh (Conservative politician) (born 1980), local politician on the Isle of Wight
David Pugh (footballer, born 1875) (1875–1945), Wrexham A.F.C., Lincoln Town F.C. and  Wales international footballer
David Pugh (footballer, born 1947) (born 1947), Welsh professional footballer
David Pugh (footballer, born 1964), Chester City F.C. and Bury F.C. footballer
David Pugh (comics), British comics artist and writer
David Pugh, editor of Practical Boat Owner magazine
David Vaughan Pugh (1907–2005), Canadian Member of Parliament
David Pugh and Dafydd Rogers, British theatre producers
David Pugh (American football) (born 1979), American football player
David Pugh (actor), English actor